Germán Guillermo Salort (born 14 October 1988) is an Argentine professional footballer who plays as a goalkeeper for Chacarita Juniors.

Career
Salort spent twelve years in the youth of Instituto, prior to signing for Chilean club Unión Española. In 2012, Salort joined General Paz Juniors of Torneo Argentino B. He was selected in three matches in 2011–12, prior to leaving the club months after signing to join Torneo Argentino A side Central Norte. Five appearances followed for Central Norte, notably his last on 8 April 2014 during a goalless draw with Juventud Antoniana. Two months later, on 30 June, Torneo Federal B's Alumni signed Salort. 2015 saw the goalkeeper make a move to Altos Hornos Zapla of Torneo Federal A. He played twenty-five times that year.

In January 2016, Salort agreed to sign for Agropecuario. The club won promotion in his first and second season, from Torneo Federal B to Primera B Nacional, with Salort playing thirty-five times whilst scoring his first two senior goals, he subsequently made his professional debut in Agropecuario's 2017–18 Primera B Nacional opener against Flandria on 24 September. Salort spent 2019–20 out on loan with Instituto.

Ahead of the 2022 season, Salort moved to Chacarita Juniors.

Career statistics
.

Honours
Agropecuario
 Torneo Federal A: 2016–17

References

External links

1988 births
Living people
Footballers from Córdoba, Argentina
Argentine footballers
Association football goalkeepers
Argentine expatriate footballers
Expatriate footballers in Chile
Argentine expatriate sportspeople in Chile
Torneo Argentino B players
Torneo Argentino A players
Primera Nacional players
Unión Española footballers
General Paz Juniors footballers
Central Norte players
Alumni de Villa María players
Altos Hornos Zapla players
Club Agropecuario Argentino players
Instituto footballers
Chacarita Juniors footballers